State Route 193 is an east and west highway located completely in Davis County, Utah, United States that begins at 3000 West, runs past the south entrance of Hill Air Force Base and ends at US-89.

Route description

SR-193 begins at the intersection of 3000 West and Bernard F. Fisher Highway in Syracuse and heads east on the latter as a four-lane highway divided by a center turn lane. After crossing SR-108 (2000 West), the route turns southeast, passing north of the Freeport Center, then returns east, crossing over the Union Pacific Railroad tracks. SR-193 descends into Clearfield as a four-lane undivided highway through suburban Clearfield, crossing SR-126 at Main Street. After a couple of intersections with local roads and passing to the north of a park, the road intersects with I-15 at exit 334, a diamond interchange. Past this interchange, Hill Air Force Base appears on the northern side of the road and the highway enters Layton. Soon, the route intersects with the northern terminus of SR-232 at Hill Field Road, which also provides access to the south gate of the air force base. Past the southeastern fringe of the base, the road turns to the southeast before intersecting with Church Street, where SR-193 turns northeast again. The highway approaches the eastern edge of Layton and terminates at a diamond interchange with US-89 at exit 404.

History
The state legislature created SR-193 in 1935, running northeast from SR-1 (now SR-126) in Layton to SR-49 (now US-89). Despite the original definition, the road was built with federal aid in 1940 and 1941 past Hill Air Force Base, with a western terminus at SR-1 in Clearfield; a separate route - SR-232 - was similarly built in 1940 and numbered in 1941, running north from Layton to SR-193 at Hill Field. The definition of SR-193 was corrected to reflect its new route in 1945.

In 2015, the route was extended west from SR-126 to 2000 West in Syracuse (SR-108). Another extension two years later brought the western terminus to 3000 West.

Major intersections

See also

 List of state highways in Utah

References

External links

193
 193
Streets in Utah